Sonny Finch (born 5 August 2005) is an English footballer who plays for Middlesbrough. and son of former Darlington Goalkeeper  Keith Finch

Career
Finch signed his first professional contract with Middlesbrough shortly after his seventeenth birthday, in August 2022. He had been with the club since U13 level. He had travelled with the first team squad for preseason training in Portugal and impressed.

Finch made his professional debut in the EFL Cup in a 1-0 defeat at home at the Riverside Stadium to Barnsley on 10 August 2022.

References

2005 births
Living people
Middlesbrough F.C. players
People from Houghton-le-Spring
Footballers from Tyne and Wear
English footballers
English Football League players
Association football forwards